Rod Stewart: The Hits is a Las Vegas concert residency performed by singer Rod Stewart at the Colosseum at Caesars Palace in Las Vegas which began in August 2011 and is scheduled to continue through October 2022.

Background 
Rod Stewart signed on for a two-year residency at the Colosseum at Caesars Palace, Las Vegas, commencing on August 24, 2011. Performing his greatest hits, the residency also saw him perform selected tracks from his upcoming, untitled blues album. Stewart said the show will be "90 percent songs that people know," including "Maggie May," "The First Cut Is the Deepest" and "You're In My Heart." The songs were performed at the Colosseum when he played at the 4,100-seat venue in November.

"It's a rock 'n' roll show," Stewart told Billboard, "We'll try to give the people what they want, which are the songs that made me famous, plus a few surprises. There won't be any magicians or midgets, just a good rock show."

Set list 

This set list is representative of the performance on August 25, 2011. It does not represent all concerts for the duration of the residency.
 "Infatuation"
 "Tonight's the Night (Gonna Be Alright)"
 "Forever Young"
 "Having a Party" (Sam Cooke)
 "You're in My Heart (The Final Acclaim)"
 "Some Guys Have All the Luck"
 "Twistin' the Night Away" (Sam Cooke)
 "Downtown Train" (Tom Waits)
 "Broken Arrow" (Robbie Robertson)
 "The Killing of Georgie (Part I and II)"
 "Chapel of Love" (The Dixie Cups)
 "Reason to Believe" (Tim Hardin)
 "Sweet Little Rock 'n' Roller" (Chuck Berry)
 "Every Picture Tells a Story"
 "Proud Mary" (Creedence Clearwater Revival) (Sung by backup singers)
 "Rhythm of My Heart"
 "The First Cut Is the Deepest"
 "Hot Legs"
 "Maggie May"
Encore
"Da Ya Think I'm Sexy?" 

Note In different shows were including new songs like:
 "Angel" - (Jimi Hendrix) 
 "It's a Heartache" - (Bonnie Tyler)
 "You Wear It Well" 
 "Ooh La La" - (Faces)
 "(I Know) I'm Losing You"
 "Gasoline Alley" 
 "Have I Told You Lately" - (Van Morrison)  
 "Rollin' and Tumblin'" - (Hambone Willie Newbern)
 "Stay with Me" - (Faces) 
 Also they included Christmas songs in the last quarter of the year.

Shows

References

Stewart, Rod
Concert residencies in the Las Vegas Valley
2011 concert residencies
2012 concert residencies
2013 concert residencies
2014 concert residencies
2015 concert residencies
2016 concert residencies
2017 concert residencies
2018 concert residencies
Caesars Palace